Richard George William Pitt Booth  (12 September 1938 – 20 August 2019) was a British bookseller, known for his contribution to the success of Hay-on-Wye as a centre for second-hand bookselling. He was also the self-proclaimed "King of Hay".

Biography
Booth was born in Plymouth, Devon. He was educated at Rugby School and Merton College, Oxford, yet he dreaded seeing how young men like himself left their hometown for the city, and wondered what trade could save this small rural economy. Having inherited the Brynmelyn estate from his uncle, Major Willie Booth, he opened a second-hand bookshop in Hay-on-Wye, in the old fire station, and took the strongest men of Hay to America, where libraries were closing fast. They bought and shipped books in containers back to Hay-on-Wye. His example was followed by others, so that by the 1970s Hay had become internationally known as the "Town of Books".

In 1973, he appeared on the American game show To Tell the Truth, hosted by Garry Moore. (Episode #1555)

On 1 April 1977, Richard Booth proclaimed Hay an "independent kingdom" with himself as king Richard Cœur de Livre and his horse as Prime Minister. The publicity stunt gained extensive news coverage and resulted in several spin-offs such as "passports" being issued.

On 1 April 2000, Booth followed up with an investiture of "The Hay House of Lords" and created 21 new hereditary peers for the "Kingdom of Hay".

The Hay Literary Festival was another spin-off from the burgeoning number of bookshops in the town, which gets an estimated 500,000 tourists a year. In recognition of his services to tourism, Richard Booth was awarded the MBE in the 2004 New Year Honours List. In August 2005, Richard Booth announced that he was selling his Hay bookshop and moving to Germany. The bookshop is now under the ownership of Elizabeth Haycox and has had extensive refurbishment works carried out since 2009.

Ultimately, Richard Booth did not move to Germany but continued to live in Brynmelyn, owning a bookshop called The King of Hay.

He married his second wife Hope Stuart, a former freelance photographer, in the 1980s. In 1999, he published his autobiography My Kingdom of Books (Y Lolfa) with the help of his stepdaughter Lucia Stuart.

Literary award
In 2014, Booth gave his name to an annual literary award in association with the Hay Writers' Circle. Judges and winners of the Richard Booth Prize for Non-Fiction have been as follows:

Politics
Booth stood as a candidate for the Socialist Labour Party in the 1999 Welsh Assembly elections and Wales constituency at the 2009 European Parliament election.

Welsh Assembly elections

European Parliament elections

Sources

External links
BBC Arts

1938 births
2019 deaths
People from Hay-on-Wye
Alumni of the University of Oxford
Welsh booksellers
Members of the Order of the British Empire
Micronational leaders
People educated at Rugby School
Socialist Labour Party (UK) members
20th-century Welsh businesspeople
21st-century Welsh businesspeople
Alumni of Merton College, Oxford